Beris vallata, the orange legionnaire or common orange legionnaire, is a European species of soldier fly.

Description
Body length 5.0 to 6.0 mm.
Abdomen entirely matt yellow, without black bands. All tibiae black in apical half. Wings of female yellowish with brown
pterostigma; wings of male blackish. Pubescence of abdomen black in male, yellow in female.

Biology
The flight period is may to September.
A hedgerow species. One larvae microhabitat is Bryophyta. The larva feeds on dead leaves and puparia have been found among fallen decomposing leaves. Adults feed on pollen and nectar including that of Tanacetum vulgare.

Distribution
North Europe, Central Europe,  Southwest Europe, north up to Sweden.European Russia.

References

Stratiomyidae
Diptera of Europe
Insects described in 1771
Taxa named by Johann Reinhold Forster